Ambili  is a 2019 Indian Malayalam-language comedy drama film written and directed by Johnpaul George. The film is produced by Mukesh R. Mehta, A. V. Anoop, C. V. Sarathi under the banner of E4 Entertainment and AVA productions. It stars Soubin Shahir, Naveen Nazim and Tanvi Ram.

Guileless like a child and ever so full of life, Ambili is beloved to everyone in his village. The story traces Ambili's outlook towards life and of the challenges surrounding him that he faces on an everyday basis.

Plot
Ambili Ganapathi (Soubin Shahir) a mentally challenged yet lovable orphan man who lives with his grandmother in a town in Kerala. The film starts off with an insight into his relationship with his childhood crush Teena Kurian (Tanvi Ram).

Ambili faces his daily struggles in life with a smile, slowly winning the hearts of everyone in the village. Teena's younger brother and Ambili's old friend Bobby Kurian (Naveen Nazim) is a 
cyclist and a frequent traveller whose passion is to get into the Guinness World Records by having the Around the World Cycling Record. Before heading to his cycling trip to Kashmir, he heads home to meet his family, where Teena expresses her desire to marry Ambili. Upset by this, Bobby fights with Ambili and sets off for his trip to Kashmir. Ambili, who looks up to Bobby, follows Bobby on his cycle. Bobby, though angry at first, later lets Ambili join him. It is later revealed that Ambili's parents died in a terrorist attack at Kashmir when he was young. His father Major Ganapathi (Binu Pappu) was a Military Officer in the Indian Army and was the one who taught Bobby how to cycle. The journey eventually restores the lost bond between Bobby and Ambili. When they finally reached Kashmir, Ambili is filled with emotions as he remembers his family and growing up with Teena and Bobby.

Cast 

 Soubin Shahir as Ambili Ganapathi
 Naveen Nazim as Bobby Kurian
 Tanvi Ram as Teena Kurian
 Jaffar Idukki as P. Vijayan
 Sreelatha Namboothiri as Teena's grandmother
 Rabiya Beegum
 Binu Pappu as Major Ganapathi, Ambili's deceased father
 Vettukili Prakash as Kurian / Kuriachen, father of Teena and Bobby, and Army colleague of Ganapathi
 Neena Kurup as Kuriachen's wife, mother of Teena and Bobby
 Anil K. Shivaram as Police Constable
 Kochu Preman as Vasukkuttan
 Ajmal M. V. as Young Ambili
 Nizam Zifran as Young Bobby
 Fahadh Faasil as Narrator

Release
The official teaser was released by E4 Entertainment on 19 July 2019.

The film was released on 9 August 2019.

Soundtrack

The soundtrack for Ambili was composed by Vishnu Vijay. Song released under E4 Entertainment official label.

References

External links
 

2019 films
2010s Malayalam-language films